Chicoreus nobilis, common name the noble murex, is a species of sea snail, a marine gastropod mollusk in the family Muricidae, the murex snails or rock snails.

Description
The size of an adult shell varies between 40 mm and 57 mm.

Distribution
This marine species is found along Vietnam, the Philippines and Japan.

References

External links
 

Gastropods described in 1977
Chicoreus